Josh Oppenheimer (born January 15, 1969) is an American-Israeli professional basketball coach and former player who is an assistant coach for the Milwaukee Bucks of the National Basketball Association (NBA) and the Greek Basketball National team.

Playing career
Oppenheimer played collegiately for Rhode Island and later Northern Arizona before embarking on a professional career in the United States and Europe. He spent two summers in the United States Basketball League playing for Atlanta, Philadelphia and Palm Beach and also logged a season in the Continental Basketball Association with Cedar Rapids. He also played the NBA Summer League and attended training camp with the Atlanta Hawks, the Los Angeles Clippers and the Sacramento Kings respectively. Oppenheimer spent six seasons in the Israeli Basketball Premier League.

Coaching career
Oppenheimer has coaching experience in the college ranks from Duquesne, Delaware, DePaul and Kent State.

NBA
In 2013, Oppenheimer joined the Milwaukee Bucks coaching staff of head coach Larry Drew. At the start of the 2016–17 NBA season, the Houston Rockets added Oppenheimer to their coaching staff as an assistant coach.

At the start of the 2017–18 NBA G League season, the Brooklyn Nets added Oppenheimer to the Long Island Nets coaching staff as an assistant coach.

On August 15, 2019, it was announced that added Oppenheimer to the James Madison coaching staff as an assistant coach.

On November 17, 2020, the Milwaukee Bucks announced that Oppenheimer has returned to the team as an assistant coach. Oppenheimer became an NBA champion when the Bucks defeated the Phoenix Suns in 6 games of the 2021 NBA Finals.

Personal life
Oppenheimer and his wife Adrienne, a former college volleyball player from Puerto Rico, have two daughters, Gabriella "Gabbi" (born July 2, 1996), who works in finance,  and Nicolette "Nikki" (born June 22, 1999), a basketball player who currently plays for James Madison University, having previously played for Syracuse University and Montini Catholic High School. Nicolette represented the Puerto Rico women's national under-18 team at the 2016 FIBA Americas Under-18 Championship for Women.

See also
 List of foreign NBA coaches

References

External links
 Josh Oppenheimer at basketball-reference.com
 Josh Oppenheimer at eurobasket.com
 Josh Oppenheimer bio at Excel Basketball

1969 births
Living people
American emigrants to Israel
American expatriate basketball people in Israel
American men's basketball coaches
American men's basketball players
American people of Israeli descent
American people of Jewish descent
Cal State Dominguez Hills Toros men's basketball players
Cedar Rapids Silver Bullets players
Delaware Fightin' Blue Hens men's basketball coaches
DePaul Blue Demons men's basketball coaches
Duquesne Dukes men's basketball coaches
Houston Rockets assistant coaches
Israeli basketball coaches
Israeli men's basketball players
James Madison Dukes men's basketball coaches
Jewish men's basketball players
Kent State Golden Flashes men's basketball coaches
Long Island Nets coaches
Maccabi Givat Shmuel players
Maccabi Tel Aviv B.C. players
Milwaukee Bucks assistant coaches
Northern Arizona Lumberjacks men's basketball players
Point guards
Rhode Island Rams men's basketball players